Pinnau was a  cargo ship that was built in 1922 by Nobiskrug Werft GmbH, Rendsburg, Germany for German owners. She was seized by the Allies in May 1945, passed to the Ministry of War Transport (MoWT) and was renamed Empire Constructor. In 1947, she was sold into merchant service and renamed Estkon. She served until 1959 when she was scrapped.

Description
The ship was built in 1922 by Nobiskrug Werft GmbH, Rendsburg.

The ship had a GRT of 1,198 and a NRT of 638.

The engine was built by Ottensener Maschinenbau, Altona.

History
Pinnau was built for Bugsier Reederei & Bergungs AG, Hamburg. Her port of registry was Hamburg. The Code Letters RCPJ were allocated. On 8 October 1931, Pinnau was in port at Leningrad, Soviet Union, where there was a dock strike. At 14:30, some 15 or 20 sailors tried to board Pinnau to search the ship. They were repelled by the crew, but not without injuries being sustained. On 16 November 1933, Pinnau was driven ashore in the Koivisto Sound, Soviet Union. She was bound for Amsterdam, Netherlands with a cargo of timber. She was refloated on 20 November. In 1934, her Code Letters were changed to DHTG.

In May 1945, Pinnau was seized by the Allies at Lübeck. She was passed to the MoWT and renamed Empire Constructor. Her port of registry was changed to London and she was placed under the management of Frank S Dawson Ltd. The Code Letters GFZX and United Kingdom Official Number 180610 were allocated. In 1947, Empire Constructor was sold to J Carlbom & Co Ltd, Hull and was renamed Estkon. She served until 1959 when she was scrapped at Newport, Monmouthshire.

References

1922 ships
Ships built in Rendsburg
Steamships of Germany
Merchant ships of Germany
World War II merchant ships of Germany
Ministry of War Transport ships
Empire ships
Steamships of the United Kingdom
Merchant ships of the United Kingdom